OUTsurance Holdings Limited, commonly referred to as OUTsurance, is a subsidiary of OUTsurance Group Limited (OUTsure, a JSE listed entity), a South African based financial services investment holding company. OUTsurance Holdings Limited was formed in 1998 and is an unlisted public company with headquarters in Centurion, South Africa. It is a financial services holding company based in South Africa, with subsidiaries in Australia and New Zealand. 

OUTsurance subsidiaries offer various short and long-term insurance as well as investment products to individual and corporate customers.

History 
OUTsurance was launched on 28 February 1998 as a wholly owned subsidiary of RMB Holdings to provide short-term insurance to individuals. On 1 January 2000,  OUTsurance acquired the First National Insurance group (FNI) from FirstRand in an all share deal that gave RMBH and FirstRand each an interest of 47.5% in the merged entity, with 5% being held by the staff trust. By virtue of its shareholding in FirstRand, RMBH has 59.4% control in OUTsurance.

2006 saw OUTsurance expand into Namibia with the launch of OUTsurance Insurance Company of Namibia in partnership with FNB Namibia. In 2008 the group launched Youi in Australia, making it the first African company to set up an insurance business in Australia. The group launched OUTsurance Life in 2010. This unit allowed the group to offer basic and fully underwritten life insurance products in South Africa. Recently, OUTsurance Life has started offering funeral and endowment products.

On 7 March 2011, RMB Holdings, Remgro and FirstRand Corporate spun off their insurance assets to RMI Holdings (then a wholly owned subsidiary of RMBH).  and separately listing it on the JSE. The stake held in OUTsurance Holding by both RMB Holdings and FirstRand were thus taken up by RMI Holdings which was then listed it on the JSE by way of introduction. This made OUTsurance Holding a subsidiary of RMI Holdings.

In July 2014, OUTsurance expanded into New Zealand with the launch of Youi New Zealand, as a subsidiary of Youi Australia. In September 2019, Tower bought Youi's New Zealand customers ending its attempt to crack the New Zealand market.

Member companies 
Companies that make up OUTsurance Holdings include but are not limited to:

 OUTsurance Insurance Company – South Africa – 100% Shareholding – Offering General Insurance and other short-term insurance products.
 OUTsurance Life Insurance Company – South Africa – 100% Shareholding – Offering life and funeral insurance to the South African public.
 OUTsurance International Holdings – South Africa – 100% Shareholding – A holding company for non-South African investments.
 OUTsurance Shared Services – South Africa – 100% Shareholding – A shared service company for the group.
 OUTsurance Properties – South Africa – 100% Shareholding – A property ownership company.
 Youi Holdings Pty Ltd – Australia – 93% Shareholding – A holding company for Australasia investments. 
 Youi (Proprietary) Limited – Australia – 93% Shareholding –Offering General Insurance
 OUTvest Pty Limited – South Africa – 100% Shareholding - Investment platform company
 OUTvest Nominees Pty Limited RF Pty Limited – 100% Shareholding – Nominee company for OUTvest Pty Limited
 CloudBadger Technologies Pty Limited – South Africa – 48% Shareholding

Ownership 
OUTsurance Holdings is an unlisted public company. As at June 30 2022, the shareholding in the group's stock was as depicted in the table below:

Governance 
OUTsurance Holdings is governed by a board of directors with Herman Bosman as the chairman with Marthinus Visser as chief executive officer.

Laurie Dippenaar retired from the board and his position as the chairman with effect 1 July 2020. He was replaced by Herman Bosman as the chairman, who is supported by a lead independent director, Kubandiran Pillay.

See also

References

External links 

Insurance companies of South Africa
Companies based in the City of Tshwane
Financial services companies established in 1998
South African companies established in 1998